Paul Barnes (born 1970, Harlow, England) is a graphic designer and typographer.  He has designed several new typefaces.

Career
After an education at the University of Reading, in 1992 he emigrated to the United States to work with Roger Black. In 1995 he left Roger Black and began work as a freelance designer in London. He has worked with many large corporations, making logos for such well known companies as Givenchy, ABC television and the English bands New Order, Electronic and Joy Division. With Christian Schwartz he designed the very large Guardian Egyptian family typefaces for The Guardian newspaper and operates the digital type design company Commercial Type.

In April 2007 he designed the logo for Kate Moss with Saville.

Awards
In September 2006 he was named one of the 40 most influential designers under 40 in Wallpaper and in September 2007 The Guardian named him one of the top 50 designers in Britain.

Typefaces designed by Paul Barnes
Austin - 2003
Brunel - 1996
Dala Floda - 2005
Dala Prisma - 2014
Guardian Egyptian - 2005, with Christian Schwartz
Ironbridge - 2002
Marian - 2005
National Trust - 2009, custom for the National Trust
Pagan Poetry - 2002
Stephenson Sans - 2001
Stockholm  - 2004

Magazine articles by Paul Barnes
 Jonathan Hoefler, Baseline 23, edited by Mike Daines & Hans Dieter Reichert, Bradbourne Publishing, 1996

External links
Modern Typography

References

1970 births
Living people
English graphic designers
English typographers and type designers
People from Harlow
People educated at King Henry VIII School, Coventry
Alumni of the University of Reading